Black Monk Time is the only studio album by German-based American rock band The Monks. It was released in March 1966 through Polydor Records and was the only album released during the band's original incarnation. The album's subversive style and lyrical content was radical for its time and today is considered an important landmark in the development of punk rock.

In 2017, Black Monk Time was ranked the 127th greatest album of the 1960s by Pitchfork.

Background 

The album was produced by Jimmy Bowien and recorded November 1965 in Cologne, Germany. "Complication" b/w "Oh, How to Do Now" was released as a single to promote the album. Like the album, it failed to garner commercial success. The single was re-issued in 2009 by Play Loud! Productions.

Critical reception 

The album was initially released to a muted critical and commercial reception, but has since gone on to become widely critically acclaimed and is now viewed as an important protopunk album. Anthony Carew in a retrospective review for About.com called it "possibly the first punk record, and is the obvious birthplace of krautrock" and "one of the 'missing links' of alternative music history". The Daily Telegraph wrote, "Listening to it now, finally, in full, remastered glory, it's hard to imagine how this primitive and often nightmarish music could have been allowed to be made at that particular time and place. [...] It may not be to every taste but, lurching according to its own sublimely clueless logic, it has a purity and heedlessness which can never be repeated." Uncut wrote, "there's really nothing that can dull the impact of hearing the Monks' music for the first time."

Accolades 

 It was included in the book 1001 Albums You Must Hear Before You Die.
 It was included in the Sunday Herald's "The 103 Best Albums Ever, Honest" list in 2001.
 It was included in UK magazine The Word' "Hidden Treasure: Great Underrated Albums of Our Time" list in 2005.
 It was  placed number 45 on Spin magazine's list of "Top 100 Alternative Albums of the 1960s".

Legacy and impact 

Black Monk Time was described in the mid-1990s by Julian Cope of The Teardrop Explodes as a "lost classic". Of the album's raw style, and the context of its production, Cope writes:

NO-ONE ever came up with a whole album of such dementia. The Monks' Black Monk Time is a gem born of isolation and the horrible deep-down knowledge that no-one is really listening to what you're saying. And the Monks took full artistic advantage of their lucky/unlucky position as American rockers in a country that was desperate for the real thing. They wrote songs that would have been horribly mutilated by arrangers and producers had they been back in America. But there was no need for them to clean up their act, as the Beatles and others had had to do on returning home, for there were no artistic constraints in a country that liked the sound of beat music but had no idea about its lyric content.

In 2006 Play Loud! Productions released a Monks tribute album, the double-LP Silver Monk Time, featuring input from 29 international bands (including the original Monks) in conjunction with the film Monks: The Transatlantic Feedback.

English post-punk band The Fall has covered four of the album's songs: "I Hate You" and "Oh How to Do Now" on their 1990 album Extricate, "Shut Up" on their 1994 album Middle Class Revolt, and "Higgle-Dy Piggle-Dy" on the 2006 Play Loud! Productions compilation Silver Monk Time.

"I Hate You" was featured in the film The Big Lebowski.

"Monk Time" was featured in a 2000 Powerade advertisement.

Beastie Boys, Jack White of The White Stripes, and Colin Greenwood of Radiohead have praised the album.

"Boys Are Boys and Girls Are Choice" was featured in a commercial for the Apple iPhone in 2017.

"We Do Wie Du" is featured in the 2017 film Logan Lucky.

Track listing

Personnel 

 Gary Burger – vocals, guitar
 Larry Clark – vocals, philicorda organ
 Roger Johnston – vocals, drums
 Eddie Shaw – vocals, bass guitar
 Dave Day – vocals, electric banjo

Release history 

This release includes extensive liner notes, including interviews and photographs

References 

Bibliography

External links 

Black Monk Time (Adobe Flash) at Radio3Net (streamed copy where licensed)
 

1966 debut albums
The Monks albums
Polydor Records albums
Protopunk albums